Yehezkel Dror (born 1928) is a professor emeritus of political science at Hebrew University, Jerusalem.

Biography
Arthur Yehezkel Dror was born in Vienna, Austria. He immigrated to Mandate Palestine with his family in 1938. He graduated from the Hebrew Reali School in Haifa in 1946.

Dror holds a B.A. and Magister Juris from the Hebrew University, and LLM and SJD (doctor of juridical sciences) qualifications from Harvard University.

In 1954, Dror married Rachel Elboim-Dror, an educational researcher, with whom he had three children: Asael, Otniel and Itiel.

Academic career
He was a faculty member of the Hebrew University's Department of Political Science from 1957 until his retirement, and was also head of its Public Administration division from 1964. He is a pioneering author in the fields of management, policy science, public administration, capacities to govern, leadership and security issues.

Colleague David Levi-Faur considers him to be "one of the most influential scholars in the founding generation of public administration in the world. He is an important voice in connection with promoting planning, prior deployment and prediction in public policy. [...] To a large degree, the world is moving against Dror, which is a pity."

In 1968, Dror joined the RAND Corporation as a senior staff member. The RAND think tank was instrumental in planning America's strategy in the Cold War. While at RAND, Dror developed the concept and introduced the term of "crazy states", arguably his most widely known contribution to strategic thought. In his definition, as laid out in his 1971 book "Crazy States", such a state or organization is characterized by fanaticism, and the fact that they follow their goals while ignoring the common profit-and-loss considerations.

Public affairs
Dror served as a senior consultant on policy-making and planning for the Israeli government, and founded the Jewish People Policy Planning Institute. He engaged in international consultantship, serving inter alia from 1968-70 as a senior staff member at the American Rand Corporation. He served on the Winograd Commission established to investigate Israel's actions in the 2006 Lebanon War. Dror had recommended the establishment of a strong National Security Council, but in his opinion, he was only given the power to effectively sustain the concept once he became part of the Winograd Commission, which led to the partial implementation of his idea. In a mid-2020 interview, he advanced the concept of a similar body being created for overseeing domestic policy.

Published works
 Public Policymaking Reexamined, Chandler (1968), Transaction Publishers (1983) and Routledge (2017), "probably the most important book on public policy making published in this century" (1970 review)
 Design for Policy Sciences, American Elsevier Publishing Company, 1971
 Crazy States: A Counterconventional Strategic Problem, Heath Lexington Books, 1971
 Policymaking under Adversity, Transaction Books, 1986
 The Capacity to Govern: A Report to the Club of Rome, Routledge, 2001
 Foreword to Public Policy in Israel: Perspectives and Practices, Dani Korn (ed.), Lexington Books, 2005
 Israeli Statecraft: National Security Challenges and Responses, Routledge, BESA Studies in International Security, 2011. "[A] fundamental treatise for public policy studies....a modern classic of continuing importance...
 Avant-Garde Politician : Leaders for a New Epoch, Westphalia Press, 2014
 For Rulers : Priming Political Leaders for Saving Humanity from Itself, Westphalia Press, 2017
 Steering Human Evolution: Eighteen Theses on Homo Sapiens Metamorphosis, Routledge, 2020

Awards and recognition
 In 1965, Dror received the Rosolio Award, the Israeli annual Civil Service Commission award for contributions to the study and practice of public administration, named after Civil Service Commissioner David (Werner) Rosolio
 In 2005, he was awarded the Israel Prize, for management.

See also
List of Israel Prize recipients

References

External links
 Yehezkel Dror Biography on PIWP database
 Articles by Yehezkel Dror
 Yehezkel Dror's Books
 Yehezkel Dror
 Israel Prize Official Site - CV of Yehezkel Dror (in Hebrew)
 Interview with Yehezkel Dror by Ofir Kafri at The Global Scholar Knowledge Initiative (GSKI)

1928 births
Living people
Jewish emigrants from Austria to Mandatory Palestine after the Anschluss
Hebrew University of Jerusalem alumni
Harvard Law School alumni
Academic staff of the Hebrew University of Jerusalem
Israel Prize in management recipients
Public administration scholars
Members of the European Academy of Sciences and Arts
Israeli people of Austrian-Jewish descent
Austrian Jews
Jewish Israeli writers